, is a former member of the Japanese idol girl group AKB48. She was in "Team K" and her talent agency was Ohta Production. She was also part of AKB48 subgroups "Honegumi from AKB48", "AKBIdoling !! " and "ICE from AKB48".

Career
Ono was born in Tokyo. AKB48 released "Aitakatta" on DefStar Records. For this song, 20 members were selected from the 36 members in TeamA & TeamK; Ono was among those selected.

Erena was also one of the focal members of Team K, taking part in most group activities.  During AKB48's concert at the Yoyogi National Gymnasium in July 2010, it was announced that Team K member Erena Ono would be graduating from AKB48 to study acting abroad. Erena graduated from AKB48 on September 27, 2010 in a Team K theater performance. Her blog was closed soon after, on 4 November. She opened a new blog again on July 27, 2011 and in early October 2011, it closed again.  In October 2011, she opened a new blog.  Ono said that she was going to study in London, but then decided to change her mind and stay in Tokyo. She stated that the reason was because she could not live outside the entertainment world. Now, she is working under LesPros Entertainment and training hard to become an actress.

In 2012, it was announced that Ono would have her solo debut with her debut single, "Erepyon". In 2013, it was announced that she would release her first album, titled "Erena". She's the first AKB graduated member to release an original album.

She appeared in the 58th Annual Kohaku Utagassen. She appeared at the 2013 Tokyo Idol Festival.

Ono won New Artist award from Japan Record Award and became nominee for Best New Artist. But she lost to Leo Ieiri.

On July 7, 2014, she announced her retirement on her blog, and her contract with LesPros Entertainment expired on July 15, 2014.

Discography

Studio albums
Erena (2013)

Solo singles
 2012-06-13 "Erepyon" (えれぴょん) – Sales: 32,938
 2012-10-03 "Erenyan" (えれにゃん) – Sales: 13,519
 2012-12-26 "Say !! Ippai" (Say !! いっぱい) – Sales: 7,706
 2013-03-06 "Kimi ga Anohi Waratteita Imi wo" (君があの日笑っていた意味を) – Sales: 5,964
 2013-05-29 "Fighting☆Hero" (ファイティング☆ヒーロー) – Sales: 5,967

Singles with AKB48
 "Aitakatta"
 "Seifuku ga Jama o Suru"
 "Keibetsu Shiteita Aijō"
 "Bingo!"
 "Boku no Taiyō"
 "Yūhi o Miteiru ka?"
 "Romance, Irane"
 "Sakura no Hanabiratachi 2008"
 "Baby! Baby! Baby!" (Digital Single)
 "Ōgoe Diamond"
 "10nen Zakura"
 "Sakurairo no Sora no Shita de"
 "Namida Surprise!"
 "Iiwake Maybe"
 "River"
 "Sakura no Shiori"
 "Majisuka Rock 'n' Roll"
 "Ponytail to Chouchou"
 "Majijo Teppen Blues"
 "Heavy Rotation"
 "Yasai Sisters"

Stage Units
Team K 1st Stage 
 
Team K 2nd Stage 
 
Team K 3rd Stage 
 
Himawarigumi 1st Stage 
 
Himawarigumi 2nd Stage 
 
Team K 4th Stage 
 
Team K 5th Stage 
 
Team K 6th Stage Reset

Filmography

Dramas
 Cat's Street (2008)
 Majisuka Gakuen (2010) as Erena
 Tank Top Fighter (2013) as Kai

Movies
  (2007)
  (2008) as Satoko Hōjō (北条沙都子)
  (2010)
 The Snow White Murder Case (2014)

Anime
 ICE (anime) (2007)  as Yuki (voice only)

Awards

Japan Record Awards

The Japan Record Awards is a major music awards show held annually in Japan by the Japan Composer's Association.

|-
| rowspan=2 | 2012
| rowspan=2 | Erena Ono
| New Artist Award
| 
|-
| Best New Artist Award
| 
|}

References

External links
 Ono Erena 
 WMJ Profile

1993 births
Living people
AKB48 members
Japanese idols
Japanese women pop singers
Warner Music Group artists
Singers from Tokyo
21st-century Japanese women singers
21st-century Japanese singers